"Parasta just nyt" is a song by Finnish singer Robin featuring Nikke Ankara. Released on 12 August 2014, the song peaked at number seven on the Finnish Singles Chart.

Chart performance

References

2014 singles
Robin (singer) songs
Finnish-language songs
2014 songs